IOMO was a British mobile game developer and publisher based in Hampshire, England. IOMO was founded by John Chasey, Glenn Broadway and Andrew Bain in 2000. Initially a developer, the company was very successful in the early stages of the mobile game industry and worked with the majority of mobile technologies and customers across the whole value chain. This ranged from pre-installed titles developed for handset manufacturers and carriers, creation of branded titles for mobile games publishers and self-published original titles.

History
The first public announcement mentioning IOMO is in May 2001 when Nokia announced development of seven WAP (Wireless Application Protocol) titles by IOMO for the Nokia Mobile Entertainment service, one of the first platforms designed for carriers to be able to host and bill for games content. IOMO also worked on SMS titles including TxtDating which launched on O2 in the UK.

As the industry moved away from WAP and SMS to Java ME titles, in May 2003 IOMO acquired mobile game studio Covert Operations Ltd for an undisclosed sum.

The peak of IOMO's success came in 2004 when in addition to winning the Develop Industry Excellence award for the second year running, IOMO were developers of half the games in the Top 10 charts for two different UK operators.

January 2004, the Vodafone Top 10 games charts included five titles developed by IOMO; Tomb Raider: The Quest for Cinnabar, Tiger Woods PGA Tour Golf, Pub Pool, Tomb Raider: The Osiris Codex and Monopoly.

November 2004, the Orange UK Top 10 games charts included five titles developed by IOMO; Pub Fruity, Colin McRae Rally 2005, Monopoly, Golf Club and Pub Darts.

In March 2004, IOMO partnered with Kayak Interactive to demonstrate the first live multiplayer pool tournament between Java ME and BREW handsets on at the GDC Mobile day of the 2004 Game Developers Conference.

This success culminated on 1 December 2004 when it was announced that InfoSpace had acquired IOMO for approximately $15 million in cash.

In January 2005, an N-Gage version of the classic Snakes, developed by IOMO was launched. The title had universally positive reviews averaging a Metacritic score of 85.

As a studio within the InfoSpace group, IOMO games were published under the InfoSpace brand. However, on 25 January 2007, InfoSpace announced it was exiting the content space and had sold its US games studio to Twistbox Games with IOMO to follow.

On 6 August 2007, IOMO was closed and staff from IOMO formed a new mobile game developer, FinBlade, and a new mobile middleware developer, Metismo.

Awards
 2002 Nokia Mobile Challenge - Entertainment Category - Foto Fun Pack 
 2003 BAFTA Nomination - Scooby Doo 
 2003 Develop Industry Excellence Award - Best Mobile Studio 
 2004 BAFTA Nomination - Tiger Woods PGA Tour 2005
 2004 BAFTA Nomination - Colin McRae Rally 2005
 2004 Develop Industry Excellence Award - Best Mobile/Handheld Studio 
 2006 Edinburgh International Entertainment Festival Edge Mobile Award - Dirty Sanchez

Embedded Games
Adventure Race on Nokia 5140i 
Foto Fun Pack on Motorola RAZR V3
GemGemPanic on Sony Ericsson T610 (Vodafone live! handsets only)
Golf on Motorola RAZR V3
Jedi Trainer on Nokia handsets
Monopoly on Motorola V525/V600
Munkiki's Castles on Nokia 3410 
Skydiver on Nokia 3510i and Nokia 5500  
Snakes 2 EX on Nokia 3300 and others
Stuntman on Motorola V525/V600
Triple Pop on Nokia 7210 and others

ExEn Games
Football Challenge published by InFusio

Java ME Games

007: Hoverchase published by Vodafone
Activision Anthology published by InFusio
Aquastax published by InfoSpace
Colin McRae Rally 2005 published by Digital Bridges
DBI 3D Golf published by Digital Bridges
Dirty Sanchez published by Infospace
Fight Club published by Superscape
Fight Club 3D published by Superscape
Finding Nemo published by Airborne/Disney Interactive
FPR Superbikes published by InfoSpace
Golf Club published by IOMO
Le Mans 2006 published by InfoSpace
Monopoly published by iFone
Now Quiz published by InfoSpace
Chase H.Q. published by Nokia
Pub Arcade published by IOMO
Pub Darts published by IOMO
Pub Fight published by IOMO
Pub Fruity / Pub Slots published by IOMO
Pub Pool published by IOMO
Pub Pool 3D published by IOMO
Pursuit Squad published by IOMO
Scooby-Doo: Jeepers Creepers published by Digital Bridges
Slot Racers published by Infospace
Steve Davis Snooker published by IOMO
Stuntman published by iFone
Thief: Deadly Shadows published by Eidos New Media
Tiger Woods PGA Tour Golf published by EA/Digital Bridges
Tiger Woods PGA Tour 2004 published by EA/Digital Bridges
Tiger Woods PGA Tour 2005 published by EA/Digital Bridges
Tomb Raider: Puzzle Paradox published by Eidos Interactive
Tomb Raider: The Quest for Cinnabar published by Eidos New Media
Tomb Raider: The Osiris Codex published by Eidos New Media
Tomb Raider: The Elixir of Life published by Eidos New Media
Tony Hawk's Project 8 published by Infospace
Tony Hawk's Proving Ground published by InFusio
Treasure Planet published by Airborne/Disney Interactive
Trickshot Pool published by Infospace
Urban Freestyle Soccer published by Acclaim Entertainment

SMS Games
TxtDating published by Digital Bridges

Symbian Games
Snakes published by Nokia
Foto Fun Pack published by IOMO
Foto Puzzle published by IOMO

WAP Games
Blinker Thinker published by Nokia
Dial-A-Word published by Froghop
Infiltrator published by Nokia
Fortune Cookie published by gameplay.com
Magic 8-Ball published by gameplay.com
NumbaRumba published by Nokia
Runway published by Nokia
Thief: Constantine's Sword published by Digital Bridges/Eidos New Media
Pass The Egg published by Vodafone
StrikeOut! published by Nokia
Tamacutie published by Aspiro
The Love Game / The Dating Game published by Aspiro
Thunderbirds published by Digital Bridges
TicTacToe published by gameplay.com
WAP Fishing published by Nokia
WAP Hunter published by Nokia
WAPPet published by gameplay.com
Wapundrum published by Nokia
Wentworth Golf published by Digital Bridges/Empire Interactive

References

Mobile game companies
Video game development companies
Defunct video game companies of the United Kingdom